The Cape Symphony is one of the largest professional orchestras in Massachusetts, located on Cape Cod, Massachusetts.

About the Cape Symphony
Artistic Director and Conductor Jung-Ho Pak leads the professional musicians of the Cape Symphony."

The season includes five Masterpiece and three CapePOPS performances, plus a New Year's Day Party and a special June event, all held in the 1,400-seat Barnstable Performing Arts Center in Hyannis, MA. During the summer, the orchestra performs for residents and vacationers at outdoor events, including the annual Symphony at the Seashore which takes place at the Cape Cod National Seashore.

The Cape Symphony is supported by trustees and staff, sponsors and supporters, and volunteers.

Music Directors
2007– Present Jung-Ho Pak
1980-2007 Royston Nash
1970-1980 Jerry Cohen
1969-1970 Osborne McConathy
1968-1969 Kalman Novak
1962-1967 Jennings Butterfield

References

Musical groups established in 1962
Barnstable, Massachusetts
Orchestras based in Massachusetts
1962 establishments in Massachusetts